Utetheisa selecta is a moth in the family Erebidae. It was described by Francis Walker in 1854. It is found in the Philippines.

References

Moths described in 1854
selecta